Jarvis Randolph Klapman (March 20, 1916 – December 20, 2000) was an American politician. He served as a member of the South Carolina House of Representatives.

Life and career 
Klapman was born in Columbia, South Carolina. He attended Brookland-Cayce High School and Fort Benning Infantry School.

In 1967, Klapman was elected to the South Carolina House of Representatives, representing Lexington County, South Carolina, serving until 1968. In 1971, he was re-elected.

Klapman died in December 2000, at the age of 84.

References 

1916 births
2000 deaths
Politicians from Columbia, South Carolina
Members of the South Carolina House of Representatives
20th-century American politicians